Mend is the debut album by the Scottish band De Rosa. Released in June 2006, it was voted 16th in Mojo’s top 50 albums of 2006. It was recorded by Scottish producer Andy Miller.

Track listing 
 Father’s Eyes – 3:26
 Camera – 2:50
 New Lanark – 3:45
 All Saints Day – 2:55
 Hopes & Little Jokes – 2:14
 Cathkin Braes – 4:42
 On Recollection – 2:54
 Evelyn – 3:57
 Hattonrigg Pit Disaster – 2:19
 Headfirst – 2:44
 The Engineer – 4:46

Lyrics by Martin John Henry. Music by De Rosa.

Personnel 
 Martin John Henry – vocals, guitars, keyboards
 James Woodside – bass, mandolin, melodica
 Neil Woodside – drums, percussion

Guests
 Alan Barr – cello on Evelyn, Hattonrigg Pit Disaster and The Engineer
 Chris Connick – additional writing on Evelyn
 Ross McGowan – additional writing on Cathkin Braes

De Rosa (band) albums
2006 debut albums